Bolesławiec pottery (English: , Polish: [bɔlɛ'swavjɛt͡s]), also referred to as Polish pottery, is the collective term for fine pottery and stoneware produced in the town of Bolesławiec, in south-western Poland. The ceramics are characterized by an indigo blue polka dot pattern on a white background or vice versa.

The art originated in the late Middle Ages, but it fully developed in the 19th century and has continued ever since. The scope of the stoneware ranges from teapots and jugs to plates, platters and candelabra. The pottery is collectively known as "Polish stoneware", as it became one of Poland's unofficial cultural symbols.

Overview
For centuries one of the premier art forms in Central Europe has been the pottery and ceramics created in the Silesia region. The durable and functional creamy white and blue stoneware pieces are unique and easily identifiable. Ceramics and pottery are a definitive part of the identity of the city of Bolesławiec (Bunzlau). The town itself is often called Miasto Ceramiki (Town of Ceramics). The town is known for the ceramics and it is one of its defining features. The ceramics there have been produced for over a thousand years.

The ceramics works are referred to as Boleslawiec pottery, or they are sometimes called by their German name: Bunzlau pottery or Bunzlauer pottery. There has recently been a resurgence in the popularity of Boleslawiec ceramic art in the United States.

The geography lends itself to ceramic work as the area is rich in natural clay deposits; the clay is still excavated today. The clay is plentiful and of extremely high quality. It has a high feldspar and silicon content, and is classified as stoneware after firing. It is fired at extremely high temperatures, around 1100-1300 degrees Celsius. The clay is brown to grey in color, and rough in texture compared to finer claybodies such as porcelain. Stoneware is sturdy and vitreous to semi-vitreous and porous when fired. Glaze can be applied and the piece can be re-fired to create a watertight surface. There is also a unique clay slip associated with the Bolesławiec supply base, the application of which results in a glossy, brown surface.

History
 
Ceramics has been a part of Bolesławiec and the entire region's history for an extremely long time. Potters and ceramic artists are on record from as early as the 14th century, with the first written record of a potter in the municipal books of Świdnica (Schweidnitz) in 1380. However, archaeological digs have shown pottery and ceramics from the early Middle Ages, and trading patterns strongly indicate their presence at such an early time.

Potters from the Bolesławiec area first united into a guild around the start of the 17th century. Most of the earliest remaining pieces date from the beginnings of the eighteenth century. They are characterized by the brown glaze and were usually pitchers or jug type vessels. Some of the vessels are lidded forms with attached tin lids, though many are open. They are wheel made and uniform in shape, and were either smooth or bore a diagonal ridge pattern. Most bear a mark of some kind, usually an individual's initials and a date.

Starting around the middle half of the 18th century the vessels started to become characterized by a natural flowing motif of “sticks”, or a raised design of flowers and leaves on a stem. The sticks were a light white in color, with the surrounding pot usually brown. This added contrast and aesthetic appeal.

Throughout the late 18th century and early 19th century the stick motif was still popular. Other popular motifs included the Bolesławiec emblem, the potter's emblem of Adam and Eve, heraldic signs, and nature motifs like florals and birds. Pitchers, mugs, and tankards were the most commonly produced works.

Around the latter half of the 19th century the white clay that had previously been used only for the stick motif started to be used for whole vessels. This was due to the innovation of Johann Gottlieb Altmann, a master potter who was the first to cast dishes instead of throwing them on the wheel. Altmann also used a new type of lead-free glaze that enabled stamping and allowed for new motifs and designs. Most of the more recognizable designs today, like the repeating circles, scales, flowers, dots, and clovers, were created at that time.

Ceramics school
In 1897 a professional ceramics school was founded in Boleslawiec. The school's first headmaster was a renowned ceramics master from Berlin, Dr. Wilhelm Pukall. He initiated changes that helped reform technical abilities and new work methods, but also supported innovative new ideas and forms of creative expression. It was a time of great growth for Boleslawiec ceramics. The school accepted mostly sons of local potters, and after their completion went on to start their own workshops.

Three important potters that worked around the turn of the century were Julius Paul, Hugo Reinhold, and Carl Werner. They helped realize the new ideas and vision of the school.  These three artists and their studios started using stenciling techniques, matte glazes, vibrant colors, and gilding. It was their new techniques that revolutionized modern Bolesławiec pottery. In 1936 the school established a cooperative of six schools called the “Bunzlauer Braunzeug”. Their work can still be found today marked by brown pots with white decorations and signed on the bottom.

Although most of Lower Silesia's ceramic workshops and studios were destroyed during World War II, and the entire German population of the town and surrounding province were removed during the transfer of the territory from Germany to Poland in 1945, the new Polish authorities and refugees made a huge effort to revive the work. The cooperative CPLiA was formed and supported by the state-run Eugeniusz Geppert Academy of Fine Arts in Wrocław. This permitted the cooperative to revive a high standard of artistic achievement and enabled funding and the influence of talented potters in Poland and throughout Europe.

Bolesławiec pottery today

All authentic Bolesławiec pottery has the “Hand made in Poland” stamped on the bottom. The Boleslawiec pottery that is most recognizable today is the white or cream colored ceramic with dark blue, green, yellow, brown, and sometimes red or purple motifs. The most common designs include dots, abstract florals, speckles, “windmills”, and the favorite “peacocks eye”. The traditions of 'Bunzlauer' pottery have been preserved in many locations in present-day Germany by expellees from the former town of Bunzlau, and their descendants. Currently, most of the original pottery that comes from Polish Bolesławiec is produced by the CPLiA cooperative and the many artists that work under it, either in factories or smaller studios. Many of the individual artists do their own work, and there is also a large crafts movement that still produces the traditional heavy brown and white stoneware.

Although Bolesławiec pottery has become more popular in the United States in the past few years, it is still largely a regional product and is known primarily in Germany and Eastern Europe. It is collected by private collectors all across the world, and is also part of many museum collections in Europe, the largest collection being in the Museum of Ceramics in Boleslawiec, in Boleslawiec, Poland. However, with the commercialization of the industry, Polish Pottery ceramics are now sold throughout the world for everyday use in the kitchen as well as collectibles.

Bolesławiec pottery was created as a mainly functional product, and still is functional today although the designs have increased in quality and intricacy. It falls in a very different category from fine English and Asian china and pottery that demands high prices in today's marketplace. Still, Boleslawiec pottery is not inexpensive. Mugs and cups usually cost anywhere from twenty to forty U.S. dollars, larger more intricate pieces like bowls, teapots, Memory boxes, and specialty plates can cost anywhere from one to two hundred U.S. dollars, and some hand-painted pieces by recognized artists can cost close to five hundred U.S. dollars or more. Price is dependent on size, type of item, quality of glaze/painting, and whether or not the piece is Unikat, or “unique” in English. When a ceramics artist has been deemed accomplished enough they earn the right to create a piece from start to finish and to be able to sign it. These pieces are stamped with UNIKAT on the bottom and are more rare and of better quality and therefore command a higher price.

Polish Pottery is hand crafted with pride at many small manufacturing companies in Boleslawiec, Poland. All of the pieces are hand painted, using sponge stamp and brushes to paint the art on each piece. All of the patterns are hand-cut by the artists in the sponge and then they use the sponges and brushes to apply the unique pattern to each piece. Sponges are used because they keep the paint wet for a long time, allowing the artist to slowly go around one piece at a time, stamping a unique specific pattern. Several of the artists will create the initial pattern and hand paint a pattern, so all of the artists know what each pattern will be and can keep a similar style to the completed pieces.

References 

Polish art
Polish pottery